Cyperus perennis is a species of sedge that is native to north western parts of Mexico.

See also 
 List of Cyperus species

References 

perennis
Plants described in 1945
Flora of Mexico